Abbath is the debut album by Norwegian black metal band Abbath. It was released on January 22, 2016, through Season of Mist. It is the only album to feature drummer Creature before his departure in December 2015  and the only one to feature King Ov Hell before his departure in June 2018. The album is composed mostly of content that Abbath had originally prepared for the next Immortal album, which was ultimately never used for it following his departure from the band in 2015.

On January 12, 2016, the entire album was made available for streaming.

Critical reception

Reviewing for Exclaim!, Renee Trotier wrote that Abbath has "proven that he doesn't need the Immortal name to expand his black metal legacy." MetalSucks' Excretakano described the record as "one hell of a ride, and very true to the music our man has built his name around."

Track listing

Personnel

Abbath
 Abbath Doom Occulta – guitar, vocals, bass on "Riding on the Wind"
 King ov Hell – bass (except "Riding on the Wind")
 Creature – drums

Additional musicians
 Ole Andre Farstad – lead guitar on "To War", "Count the Dead", "Fenrir Hunts"
 Gier Bratland – keyboard and samples (except "Ocean of Wounds")
 Herbrand Larsen – keyboard and samples on "Ocean of Wounds"

Technical personnel
 Dag Erik Nygaard – guitar and bass engineering
 Daniel Bergstrand – drums engineering, mixing
 Giorgos Nerantzis – mixing, engineering, mastering
 Urban Nasvall – drum tech

Charts

References

2016 debut albums
Abbath (band) albums
Season of Mist albums